The Madden Baronetcy, of Kells, County Kilkenny, is a title in the Baronetage of the United Kingdom. It was created in 1919 for the naval commander, Admiral Sir Charles Madden. He was succeeded by his son, the second Baronet, who was also a distinguished naval officer and served as Commander-in-Chief of the Home Fleet between 1963 and 1965.

Madden baronets, of Kells (1919)
Sir Charles Edward Madden, 1st Baronet (1862–1935)
Sir Charles Edward Madden, 2nd Baronet (1906–2001)
Sir Peter John Madden, 3rd Baronet (1942–2006)
Sir Charles Jonathan Madden, 4th Baronet (born 1949)

The heir apparent is Samuel Charles John Madden (born 1984).

Arms

Notes

Baronetcies in the Baronetage of the United Kingdom
History of County Kilkenny
1919 establishments in Ireland